SMA Trimurti is a  school in the city of Surabaya, Jawa Timur, Indonesia, founded August 8, 1954.

See also

List of schools in Indonesia
List of universities in Indonesia

References

External links
 
 Primary education in the Dutch East Indies